Needham & Company is an independent investment bank and asset management firm specializing in advisory services and financings for growth companies. Needham & Company is a wholly owned subsidiary of The Needham Group, which also operates a private equity investment business and an investment management business.

Since its founding, the firm has acted as lead or co-manager in more than 775 public offerings, including 268 IPOs, been an agent on more than 115 private placements, and completed over 380 mergers and acquisitions. Together, the transactions total over $200 billion. 
The firm is headquartered in New York City, with offices in Boston, Massachusetts, Chicago, Illinois, Menlo Park and San Francisco, California.

History
Needham was founded in 1985 by George Needham, Raymond Godfrey, and David Townes.  George Needham was formerly a managing director of First Boston Corporation, where he established its business development and technology investment banking groups.  Raymond Godfrey was vice president of business development at First Boston beginning in 1977. He left Needham in the 1990s, but returned in 2000.  David Townes, who also co-founded the firm, had previously been an investment banker at Lehman Brothers Kuhn Loeb focused on technology companies.

Among its many other assignments, Needham was an underwriter for the initial public offering for Google in 2005.

Business
The company offers a full line of financial services, including brokerage, asset management, and research. In all its activities, Needham, focuses primarily on serving emerging growth industries and their investors.

Investment banking
Within its investment banking division, Needham & Company provides various advisory and financing services, which include:

 Private placements
 Public equity offerings
 Mergers and acquisitions advisory services
 Institutional sales and trading and equity research

Asset management
Needham Investment Management, another wholly owned subsidiary of The Needham Group, offers several mutual funds and hedge funds including Needham Aggressive Growth Fund (NEAGX), Needham Small Cap Growth Fund (NESGX) and most notably, The Needham Growth Fund (NEEGX), which has been rated a top-performing mutual fund since its inception.

The funds seek to create long-term capital appreciation for its shareholders by adhering to co-founder George Needham’s long-term and patient investment style. The funds invest in venture-backed companies and emphasize knowing the management. The funds focus on growth sectors including technology and healthcare.

Needham Asset Management, another affiliate, controls Needham Capital Partners, which manages private equity funds that invest primarily in growth companies.

References

External links
Needham & Company (company website)
Needham Funds (company website)

Investment banks in the United States
American companies established in 1985
Financial services companies established in 1985
Banks established in 1985
Companies based in New York City
Venture capital firms of the United States